Krobyzoi is a Thracian, Getae or Dacian tribe.

See also 
 List of Dacian tribes
 List of Thracian tribes
 List of ancient cities in Thrace and Dacia

References

Further reading 

 Hecataeus of Miletus
 Strabon
 Pseudo-Scymnus
 Phylarchus
 Athenalos (Athenaeus?)
 Suidas
 V. Besevliev

External links 

Ancient tribes in Thrace
Ancient tribes in Dacia
Thracian tribes